Charles Buxton (18 November 1822 – 10 August 1871) was an English brewer, philanthropist, writer and member of Parliament.

Personal life and architectural legacy
Buxton was born on 18 November 1822 in Cromer, Norfolk, the third son of Sir Thomas Buxton, 1st Baronet, a notable brewer, MP and social reformer, and followed in his father's footsteps, becoming a partner in the brewery of Truman, Hanbury, Buxton, & Co in Brick Lane, Spitalfields, London, and then an MP. He served as Liberal MP for Newport, Isle of Wight (1857–1859), Maidstone (1859–1865) and East Surrey (1865–1871).  His son Sydney Buxton was also an MP and governor of South Africa.

On 7 February 1850, he married Emily Mary Holland, the eldest daughter of physician Henry Holland (physician to Queen Victoria and later president of the Royal Institution).

Around 1850, he commissioned construction of a small detached, but ornate, house, Foxholm (Grade II-listed architecturally) on Redhill Road, then in Wisley but now in Cobham, for the Chaplain to Queen Victoria. He was commissioned lieutenant in the Tower Hamlets Rifle Volunteers (No. 3) on 4 May 1860.

In 1860 he had his own house, Foxwarren Park, built on the neighbouring estate between a golf course and the Site of Special Scientific Interest which is Ockham and Wisley Commons. It is a Grade II* listed building.  The building is stark Neo-Gothic: polychrome brickwork, red with blue diapering, and terracotta dressings, renewed plain-tiled roofs with crow-stepped gables.

He died on 10 August 1871. His probate was sworn in 1871 in a broad bracket of "under ".
 
His younger son was first and last Earl Buxton: Sydney Buxton, 1st Earl Buxton.

Anti-slavery parliamentary campaigners' memorial fountain
Following his father's death, Buxton commissioned architect Samuel Sanders Teulon to design the Buxton Memorial Fountain to commemorate his father's role, with others, in the abolition of slavery. The fountain was initially erected in Parliament Square but was later moved to its current position in Victoria Tower Gardens, Westminster. It carries the dedication:

Published works
He produced Memoirs of Sir Thomas Fowell Buxton, Baronet, with Selections from his Correspondence, first published in 1848. He later wrote a history, Slavery and Freedom in the British West Indies, published in 1860.

References

External links 

 

1823 births
1871 deaths
People from Cobham, Surrey
Liberal Party (UK) MPs for English constituencies
UK MPs 1857–1859
UK MPs 1859–1865
UK MPs 1865–1868
UK MPs 1868–1874
Younger sons of baronets
Charles
Members of Parliament for Newport (Isle of Wight)
British Militia officers